William O. Richardson (born June 9, 1955) is an American politician. He was elected to the North Carolina House of Representatives in 2015. A Democrat, he represented the 44th district from 2015 to 2023. He also previously served in the House from 1993 to 1996. He ran for the North Carolina Senate in the 19th district during the 2014 elections. He lost the general election to Wesley Meredith. Richardson ran for North Carolina's 8th congressional district in the 2002 election. He lost the primary to Chris Kouri.

Richardson's unsuccessful defense of Timothy Hennis, who perpetrated the Eastburn family murders, was featured in the CNN documentary series Death Row Stories.

Early life and education
Richardson graduated from the University of North Carolina at Chapel Hill in 1977 and the Norman Adrian Wiggins School of Law at Campbell University in 1980.

Electoral history

2020

2018

2016

References

|-

1954 births
Living people
Democratic Party members of the North Carolina House of Representatives
21st-century American politicians
University of North Carolina at Chapel Hill alumni
Campbell University alumni